The witchetty grub (also spelled witchety grub or witjuti grub) is a term used in Australia for the large, white, wood-eating larvae of several moths. In particular, it applies to the larvae of the cossid moth Endoxyla leucomochla, which feeds on the roots of the witchetty bush (after which the grubs are named) that is widespread throughout the Northern Territory and also typically found in parts of Western Australia and South Australia, although it is also found elsewhere throughout Australia.

The term may also apply to larvae of other cossid moths, ghost moths (Hepialidae), and longhorn beetles (Cerambycidae). The term is used mainly when the larvae are being considered as food. The grub is the most important insect food of the desert and has historically been a staple in the diets of Aboriginal Australians.

Terminology
Similarly, Ngalea peoples referred to the grub as "mako wardaruka", meaning grubs of the wardaruka (Acacia ligulata) shrub. The Pitjantjatjara name is "maku".

Traditionally, it is rare for people to dig for them.

Description

The different larvae are said to taste similar, probably because they have similar wood-eating habits. Edible either raw or lightly cooked in hot ashes, they are sought as a high-protein food by Aboriginal Australians. The raw witchetty grub tastes similar to almonds, and when cooked, the skin becomes crisp like roast chicken, while the inside becomes light yellow, like a fried egg.

These grubs live in trees. They can also be found in black wattle trees, and are considered to be the reason why wattles die within 10 to 15 years. The roots of the Acacia kempeana shrub are another source of the grubs.

When held, as a defence mechanism, the grubs will secrete a brown liquid.

Cultural significance
Witchetty grubs feature as Dreamings in many Aboriginal paintings.

See also

 Huhu beetle
 Bush tucker

References

External links

Witchetty Grub on Australian Insects

Insect common names
Polyphyletic groups
Australian Aboriginal bushcraft
Australian cuisine
Bushfood
Cerambycidae
Edible insects
Insects of Australia
Lepidoptera and humans
Australian Aboriginal words and phrases
Insects in culture